Jacques Bernard Modeste d'Anselme (22 July 1740, Apt – 17 September 1814, Paris) was a French general of the French Revolutionary Army, notable as the first commander of the Army of the Var which soon became the Army of Italy. He fell under suspicion, was removed from command and placed under arrest, but he survived the Reign of Terror. ANSELME is one of the names inscribed under the Arc de Triomphe, on Column 23.

Biography
He became a knight of Saint Louis on 18 April 1770. During the American Revolution, he was a lieutenant colonel of the Regiment of Soissons. As lieutenant general, he took Nice and the fortresses of Mont Alban and Villefranche-sur-Mer in 1792, but was defeated at Sospello and imprisoned until the revolution of Thermidor. His name is inscribed on the Arc de Triomphe.

Notes

References
 Pierre Larousse, Grand Dictionnaire universel du XIXe siècle, 15 volumes, 1863–1890.
 Louis Gabriel Michaud, Biographie universelle ancienne et moderne, 35 vol.,  1773–1858.

 
 

1740 births
1814 deaths
Burials at Père Lachaise Cemetery
French generals
French military personnel of the American Revolutionary War
French military personnel of the French Revolutionary Wars
French Republican military leaders of the French Revolutionary Wars
French military personnel of the Napoleonic Wars
People from Vaucluse
Names inscribed under the Arc de Triomphe